State Road 189 (NM 189) is a  paved, two-lane state highway in Doña Ana County in the U.S. state of New Mexico. NM 189's western terminus is near Vado at the road's junction with NM 478, and the eastern terminus is at the road's junction with NM 28 within La Mesa community.

Route description
The highway begins at the junction with NM 28 in La Mesa. The road heads east through pecan orchards and fields of Mesilla Valley for  before turning northeast. At  the highway crosses the Rio Grande river over a  bridge, built in 1941. The road continues northeast and crosses railroad tracks of El Paso Subdivision of BNSF Railway right before reaching its eastern terminus at intersection with NM 478.

History
The section occupied by modern day NM 189 was initially built in 1940-1942 as a connector between NM 28 and US 85 in Vado. From late 1950s this stretch was part of NM 227 running between NM 28 and U.S. Route 85 (US 85). In 1988, the New Mexico Department of Transportation (NMDOT) went through a radical road renumbering program, and this stretch was designated as NM 189.

Major intersections

See also

References

External links

189
Transportation in Doña Ana County, New Mexico